Greece has competed at every celebration of the Mediterranean Games since the 1951 Mediterranean Games. As of 2018, Greek athletes have won a total of 809 medals. The country's ranking in the history of the Games is the 6th place.

Medal tables

Medals by Mediterranean Games

Medals by sport

See also
 Greece at the Olympics
 Greece at the Paralympics
 Sport in Greece

References

External links
Mediterranean Games, Hellenic Olympic Committee